Sigrid Bonde Tusvik (born 2 February 1980) is a Norwegian television presenter and entertainer.

Early life
Tusvik was born in Nordstrand in Oslo, Norway. She went to Westerdals School of Communication.

Career
She has appeared many times on the television programme Torsdag kveld fra Nydalen (Thursday night from Nydalen) on the Norwegian television channel TV 2.

Publications
 Noe med media: en bok om hva du kan bli (Something with Media: A book about what you can become), 2008, 
 Glitterfitter: helt sanne historier om å være ung kvinne (Glittercunts: totally true stories about being a young woman), 2009,

Filmography
 Hjelp, vi er i filmbransjen (2011)

Personal life
Tusvik is married to Martin Jøndahl who works for the Norwegian television channel VGTV. They have a son and daughter.

References

External links

 Biography (norge)
 IMDb

1980 births
Living people
Norwegian television personalities
Television people from Oslo
TV 2 (Norway) people
Norwegian women comedians
Norwegian stand-up comedians
Women television personalities